Carrigallen is a small village in County Leitrim, Ireland. It is located on the R201 and R203 roads in the east of the county. , the village had a population of 387.

Location

The village is set between the north and south shores of Town Lake in South Leitrim and is a centre for angling.

History
St. Patrick is said to have passed through this region. While there he baptised followers at St. Patrick's holy well in Aghawillin and before leaving the region he blessed the ancient graveyard of Errew. Throughout at least the 19th and 20th centuries, a number of annual fairs were held at Carrigallen on – 12 April, 7 May, 28 May, 9 August, 8 October, and 31 December.

Theatre
In the centre of the town is the Corn Mill Theatre & Arts Centre which presents a programme of drama (amateur and professional), variety shows, music and poetry. While a tradition of drama in Carrigallen goes back to the late 1800s, the present group was founded in 1963 as "The Community Players". In 1989, the group opened the theatre, and the name of the group was changed to the Corn Mill Theatre Company. In 1999, works took place on the foyer, dressing rooms, rehearsal and storage areas.

Transport
Carrigallen is served by Bus Éireann once daily from Monday to Saturday. Different destinations are served each day. For example, route 463 travels to Longford along two different routes on Mondays and Wednesdays, route 465 serves Cavan on Tuesdays, route 464 serves Enniskillen on Thursdays, and route 462 travels to and from Sligo along two different routes on Fridays and Saturdays.

During college terms, a bus service is operated on Sunday evenings by Geraghty Travel to Athlone IT, GMIT and NUI Galway. The service returns to Carrigallen on Friday afternoons.

Local Link Donegal Sligo Leitrim operate route 573 twice daily to Ballinamore, with a third service on Fridays. One service each day extends to Drumshanbo.

Schools and churches

Schools include Saint Mary's National School and Carrigallen Vocational School. Churches include: Saint Mary's Church, which is Catholic and was built in 1846; a Church of Ireland church built in 1814; and a Presbyterian church.

People
 Margaret Haughery (1813–1882) lived here. She was a philanthropist who opened orphanages in the New Orleans area, and was known as "Margaret of New Orleans" and "the mother of orphans". Her birthplace, located in Tully, is a tourist attraction.
 John Godley, 3rd Baron Kilbracken (1920-2006), an author and journalist, lived at Killegar House, the ancestral seat of the Godley family. His grandfather, Arthur Godley, 1st Baron Kilbracken (1847-1932), was Permanent Under-Secretary of State for India.
 Patrick McGoohan (1928–2009) was born in Queens in New York City on 19 March 1928, the son of Irish immigrant parents Rose (née Fitzpatrick) and Thomas McGoohan. Shortly after he was born, the family moved back to Ireland, where they lived in the Mullaghmore area of Carrigallen.

See also
 List of towns and villages in the Republic of Ireland

References

External links
 Carrigallen Official Homepage.

Towns and villages in County Leitrim